The following table indicates the party of elected officials in the U.S. state of Georgia:
Governor
Lieutenant Governor
Secretary of State
Attorney General
State School Superintendent
Commissioner of Agriculture
Commissioner of Insurance
Commissioner of Labor

The table also indicates the historical party composition in the:
State Senate
State House of Representatives
State Public Service Commission
State delegation to the United States Senate
State delegation to the United States House of Representatives

For years in which a presidential election was held, the table indicates which party's nominees received the state's electoral votes.

Darker shading indicates confirmed partisan affiliation or majority; lighter shading indicates likely, but unconfirmed, partisan affiliation or majority.

1775–1788

1789–1874

1875–present

References

See also
Politics in Georgia
Politics of Georgia

Politics of Georgia (U.S. state)
Government of Georgia (U.S. state)
Georgia (U.S. state)